Cédric is a Franco-Belgian comics series written by Raoul Cauvin, illustrated by Laudec, and published by Dupuis.

The comic is about the adventures of a young rascal, including his family and his school life. Cédric is a hero close to the hearts of all children, funny yet tender at the same time. Between the mistress, the school shrink, nosy parents, rowdy pals, an odious niece, and a temperamental girlfriend, Cédric finds it hard to keep his tranquility. For the better part of it, his grandfather is always at hand, be it when badly hit or to hit badly. 

Since 1989, 23 albums have been published by Dupuis. Cédric is one of the most popular French-language comics according to the list of best-selling new comics of the ACBD, with e.g. in 2006 alone 288,900 albums, putting Cédric at the fourth spot. By 2008, Cédric had dropped to the 8th position, still selling around 273,000 copies that year. A series of animated cartoons based on the comic have been produced as well.

Characters
Cédric is a boisterous young boy arriving, in the first volume, at his new school. He quickly meets Christian, who becomes his best friend, and Miss Nelly, his teacher with whom he falls in love. He lives with his maternal grandfather and his parents with an often tense atmosphere between his father Robert and his grandfather Jules. Regularly, his mother Marie-Rose does not cook so his annoyed grandfather Jules threatens to leave for the hospital. Cédric is a very bad student since he is in love with Miss Nelly. Whenever he has to show his grades to his father Robert, he finds a trick to go out and play with his friends. In all the volumes or episodes he has a fight with someone.
Marie-Rose, is Cédric's mother and Robert's Wife. She is a housewife and regularly tries to avoid arguments with her husband Robert and her father Jules. She loves Cedric, even though she sometimes puts it in all its forms. She knows how to be strict with her son, for example when he has to walk his neighbor's dog.
Robert, is Cédric's father and Marie-Rose's Husband. an Oriental rug salesmen. He met his wife Marie-Rose in his shop and he resents his father-in-law. He is often angry and shouts, especially when Cédric brings back his grades. But he can give good advice to his son when it is most needed.
Jules Boudinet, is Cédric's grandfather and Marie-Rose's father who hates his son-in-law, but does not hide it. He does not like the fact that he is a carpet seller. He often threatens to go to the hospital if he is not treated properly. He explains Robert is a seller of "mats", which greatly annoys him. He shares a great complicity with Cédric, his grandson: Always telling him stories of his youth, but he can commit blunders sometimes. For example, once, Cédric is aware of the financial difficulties of his parents. He will therefore seek employment in all businesses in the city to earn money, even though he's only 8 years old. His grandfather often gives him advice based on his own experience.
Chen Yauping, a Chinese girl who arrives at the school in the third volume. Immediately, Cédric falls in love with Chen and becomes gently possessive and jealous if another guy comes up to her or to him to talk about her. Chen is annoyed by Cédric but still considers him as a friend. She often plays jump rope with other girls. Cédric does everything to please her but she doesn't seem to be aware of it. Nicolas Ventou is also charmed by her. And as he is wealthy, he does not hesitate to offer any tremendous gifts, like horse riding and evening dress. However, Chen is indifferent with all the boys.
Christian, Cédric's best friend. He helps him in trying to obtain Chen's affections.
Nicolas Ventou, a rich schoolboy who is Cédric's rival and talks to Chen which makes Cédric jealous.
Miss Nelly, Cédric's teacher. She loves Cédric a lot, but whenever he hasn't read his lessons, she becomes very angry and she punishes him.
Stephane, another of Cédric's schoolmate.
Lily: She is a young girl who appears for the first time at the end of the twenty-second volume. Asthmatic, she is madly in love with Cédric.
Yolanda, is Cédric's proud and arrogant cousin. Her nickname is Yeti.
Sophie, a friend of Chen.
Laurent, a comrade of Cédric. His parents divorce in the episode The Divorce.
Valerie, a friend of Chen.
Adeline, a friend of Chen and the sister of Christian. She wears a hair bow and a pink T-shirt.
Jean-Bernard, a student. He has an orange flat-cap.
Julien, another student.
Manu, a friend of Cédric. He has a flat pink cap, black hair and a white vest, and likes watching TV.
Caligula, Mrs. Bertrand's dog.
Tiberius, Nicolas' dog, who has a moustache.
Aunt Martha, Cédric's aunt.
 Caprice, a sporty and athletic African American who Christian has a crush on.

Albums
 Premieres classes 02/1989
 Classes de neige 08/1989
 Classe tous risques 05/1990
 Papa a de la classe 03/1991
 Quelle mouche le pique ? 02/1992
 Chaud et froid 01/1993
 Pépé se mouille 03/1994
 Comme sur des roulettes 11/1994
 Parasite sur canapé 10/1995
 Gâteau-surprise 11/1996
 Cygne d'étang 08/1997
 Terrain minets 08/1998
 Papa, je veux un cheval ! 08/1999
 Au pied, j'ai dit ! 07/2000
 Avis de tempête 07/2001
 Où sont les freins ? 04/2002
 Qui a éteint la lumière ? 11/2002
 Enfin seuls ! 11/2003
 On se calme ! 11/2004
 J'ai fini ! 11/2005
 On rêvasse? 11/2006
 Elle est moche ! 03/2008
 Je veux l'épouser ! 03/2009
 J'ai gagné ! 03/2010
 Qu'est-ce qu'il a ? (2011)
 Graine de star (2012)
 C'est quand qu'on part ? (2013)
 Faux départ ! (2014)
 Un look d'enfer ! (2015)
 Silence, je tourne ! (2016)
 Temps de chien ! (2017)
 C'est pas du jeu ! (2018)
 Sans les mains (2019)
 Couché, sale bête ! (2021)
 Trop tôt pour toi, gamin ! (2022)

English translations

Cinebook has started publishing Cédric since 2008. Six albums have been released so far (original French album numbers in parentheses):

 (3) High-Risk Class - Sep 2008 
 (4) Dad's Got Class - Sep 2009 
 (5) What Got Into Him? - May 2011   
 (6) Hot And Cold - May 2013   
 (7) Grandpa Dives In - June 2015   
 (8) Skating On Thin Ice - July 2018

Animated series
In 2001, French television channel Canal J started broadcasting the animated series based loosely on the comics. The same series started 20 days later on France 3 as well, and returned in 2011 on France 5 (part of Zouzous). Until now, 104 episodes of 13 minutes each have been made, with 52 more to come. 12 DVDs have been produced so far. 

In 2005, PorchLight Entertainment dubbed the series with English voices and released them to DVD through Genius Entertainment. Cédric was aired in Tamil language on Chutti TV and in Malayalam language on Kochu TV. In Canada, it was aired in Teletoon from January 8, 2002 to December 23, 2010, but the German version was aired on Super RTL as part of Toggo, then after Marsupilami or Totally Spies!, from November 3, 2002 to December 23, 2013.

Episodes
The Pilot - Cédric's grades are falling down, and so he joins a music class, just to impress Chen and also go around the world with her.
In Style - Cédric wants to fit in by styling himself. His idea of ear piercing though, could get him grounded!
I Want to Marry Her - Cédric wants to marry Chen, and so he and Christian give her a cassette player.
My Cousin, Yolanda - Cédric's cousin Yolanda visits.
Tiberius Versus Caligula - Nicolas is stealing Chen with his dog, and Cédric borrows his neighbor's mutt. It seems as though Nicolas and Cédric will have to compete to see whose dog is "best in show".

Video Game 

 2005 : Cédric : Chen is Lost!
 2006 : Cédric : The Treasure Hunt
 2008 : Cédric : Chen's Birthday (released on July 4, 2008)
 2020 : Cédric : Mission Christian (released on February 8, 2020)

Books 
From 2002 on, a series of 23 books about Cédric have appeared in French in the Bibliothèque rose.

References

External links

Cédric at publisher Dupuis
Cédric at IMDb
Laudec Official Website

Bandes dessinées
Belgian comic strips
Belgian comics characters
Dupuis titles
Child characters in comics
Comics characters introduced in 1989
Gag-a-day comics
Humor comics
1989 comics debuts
Comics adapted into television series
Comics adapted into animated series